The 2012 Shanghai Rolex Masters was a men's tennis tournament that was played on outdoor hard courts. It was the fourth edition of the Shanghai ATP Masters 1000, classified as an ATP World Tour Masters 1000 event on the 2012 ATP World Tour. It took place at Qizhong Forest Sports City Arena in Shanghai, China from October 8 to October 14, 2012. Second-seeded Novak Djokovic won the singles title.

Finals

Singles

  Novak Djokovic defeated  Andy Murray, 5–7, 7–6(13–11), 6–3

Doubles

  Leander Paes' /  Radek Štěpánek defeated  Mahesh Bhupathi / Rohan Bopanna, 6–7(7–9), 6–3, [10–5]

Points and prize money

Points

Singles main-draw entrants

Seeds

 Rankings are as of October 1, 2012

Other entrants
The following players received wildcards into the singles main draw:
  Lleyton Hewitt
  Li Zhe
  Wu Di 
  Zhang Ze

The following players received entry from the qualifying draw:
  Brian Baker
  Michael Berrer
  Alex Bogomolov Jr.
  Łukasz Kubot
  Lu Yen-hsun
  Marinko Matosevic
  Philipp Petzschner

Withdrawals
  Julien Benneteau → replaced by  Grigor Dimitrov
  Juan Martín del Potro (left wrist injury) → replaced by  Go Soeda
  David Ferrer (stomach virus) → replaced by  Tommy Robredo
  Mardy Fish (health issues) → replaced by  Alejandro Falla
  Marcel Granollers → replaced by  Ryan Harrison
  Gaël Monfils → replaced by  Albert Ramos Viñolas
  Rafael Nadal (left knee injury) → replaced by  Martin Kližan
  Andy Roddick (retired from tennis) → replaced by  Benoît Paire

Retirements
  Florian Mayer (rib injury)

Doubles main-draw entrants

Seeds

 Rankings are as of October 1, 2012

Other entrants
The following pairs received wildcards into the doubles main draw:
  Yu Chang /  Zhe Li
  Maoxin Gong /  Zhang Ze
The following pairs received entry as alternates:
  Fabio Fognini /  Martin Kližan

Withdrawals
  Ryan Harrison

References

External links
Official website

 
Shanghai ATP Masters 1000
Shanghai Masters (tennis)
Shanghai Rolex Masters
Shanghai Rolex Masters